The City of Armadale is a local government area in the southeastern suburbs of the Western Australian capital city of Perth, about  southeast of Perth's central business district.

History
Prior to European settlement, the area now known as the City of Armadale was part of the land that was occupied by the Aboriginal Noongar people.

Prior to 1894, the area was part of the Canning Road District.

The City of Armadale originated as the Kelmscott Road District, which was created on 14 December 1894 out of parts of Fremantle and Jandakot Road Districts. On 24 March 1910, it was renamed the Armadale-Kelmscott Road District.

On 1 July 1961, it became the Shire of Armadale–Kelmscott following the enactment of the Local Government Act 1960. On 1 July 1977, its Byford Ward was abolished and transferred to the Shire of Serpentine–Jarrahdale.

On 1 July 1979 it became the Town of Armadale and on 16 November 1985 it assumed its current name when attained city status.

The City of Armadale maintains 615 km of roads and a little over 14 km² of parks and gardens.

Mayors

Wards
The city has been divided into seven wards, each with two councillors. The mayor is elected from among the councillors.

 Heron Ward
 Lake Ward
 Hills Ward
 Minnawarra Ward
 Ranford Ward
 Palomino Ward
 River Ward

Suburbs
The suburbs of the City of Armadale with population and size figures based on the most recent Australian census:

Population

 Note: The 1976 figure above, reported from the 1978 year book and 1981 census, is the figure after the removal of 1,634 residents living in Byford and nearby areas, which occurred in 1977.

Heritage-listed places

As of 2023, 162 places are heritage-listed in the City of Armadale, of which 13 are on the State Register of Heritage Places, among them Araluen Botanic Park, the Canning Contour Channel and the Old Jarrah Tree.

References

External links
 

 
Armadale
1894 establishments in Australia